Vũ Thị Hoàng My (born 13 November 1988, in Đồng Nai Province) is a Vietnamese beauty queen, athlete, humanitarian activist, and filmmaker. She is the first Vietnamese beauty pageant titleholder to be chosen to represent the 2 biggest beauty pageants in the world: Miss Universe 2011 and Miss World 2012 and was the strongest representative of Vietnam (2011). Hoang My is considered an icon of healthy lifestyle, and has had success as a model, host, copywriter, and dancer. She consults for beauty pageants, sports projects, NGO 
organisations and film projects. As a filmmaker, she produces both fiction and documentary features. She speaks Vietnamese and English fluently. Hoang My was one of the 7 main judges of the Miss Universe Vietnam 2017 and 2022.

Early life and family
Hoàng My, which translates in English to "Golden Beauty", was born into a family of headmasters, educators, architects and agriculturalists. Her early life was spent at Đồng Nai Province in southeastern Vietnam, where foreign investment in the primary and secondary sectors of the economy has been heavy since the Đổi Mới economic policy of the late 1980s. As a high school student, she sat as a representative on social committees and the governing student body at Thống Nhất A High School. She was a multimedia design student at RMIT University (2011), Saigon South Campus 
 and a BFA in filmmaking student at New York Film Academy, Universal Studio, LA, USA.

Pageantry

Miss Vietnam 2010

In the first year she participated, Vu Hoang My became the first runner-up of Miss Vietnam 2010, answering the question about Halong Bay:

 Final Question: What do you know about Halong Bay, where the Miss Vietnam Pageant is happening?
 Answer: Halong Bay is the intersection of the earth, the sky and the ocean. It has an imposing beauty and its impression can touch our hearts easily. Halong Bay was voted one of the New7Wonders of Nature. To me, after several years, now that I have come back, Halong Bay makes me feel like I am seeing my old soulmate.

Miss Universe 2011
Vũ Hoàng My was selected by Unicorp - the franchise holder - to represent Vietnam in the Miss Universe 2011 competition in São Paulo, Brazil in August and September 2011. In the opinion of some critics, she was one of the best Vietnamese representatives ever to participate in the international beauty pageant circuit.

Miss World 2012

Hoang My was recommended by Elite Vietnam - the franchise holder - to be the official representative of Vietnam at Miss World 2012 in Ordos, Inner Mongolia, China. She brought a strong image of Vietnam and impressed her fans and followers by her clips:
 Vu Hoang My - Interview at Miss World
 Vu Hoang My - Miss World 2012 - PROFILE - Vietnam 
 Vu Hoang My - Miss World 2012 - BEAUTY WITH A PURPOSE
 Vu Hoang My - MY BEAUTIFUL COUNTRY

Hoang My was always voted into the top 3 in Miss Media and received the biggest support from her fans (43,321 likes on 'Miss World - Vietnam') Facebook Fan Page during 1 month of Miss World 2012.

Hoang My was in top beach beauty of Miss World 2012.

Experience 
 2022 - Actress - Toa Do Hanh Phuc TV series
 2022 - Gameshow Domination Vietnam - Winner with Tran Viet Bao Hoang
 2022 - One of the 7 main judges of the Miss Universe Vietnam 2022
 2021 - Vietnam Why Not Reality Show - Winner Team Khan Ran
 2021 - Frontline against Covid-19 epidemic - Volunteer  
 2017 - One of the 7 main judges of the Miss Universe Vietnam 2017
 01/2016–present - Producer, director of a documentary.
 10/2015 - Partnership Director of Miss Universe Vietnam 2015
 09/2015 - Ambassador of Vietnam Mountain Marathon 2015
 05/2015 - Ambassador of VNG Ironman 70.3 Vietnam 2015
 01/2014 - BFA in Filmmaking - New York Film Academy - Scholarship.
 11/2013 - Interviewing stars and director of '47 Ronin' - Tokyo, Japan.
 01/2013 - 1 Year Acting For Film Attending - New York Film Academy, LA - scholarship.
 09/2012 - Co-host of reality show. Martin Yan - Taste Of Vietnam.
 05/2012 - Attending 65th Cannes Film Festival in France.
 04/2012 - Interviewing Super Stars and Director of the blockbuster, The Avengers in 2012 in Hollywood.
 03/2012 - Dancing With The Stars Vietnam 2012.
 08/2012 - Miss World 2012 in Ordos, Inner Mongolia, China.
 08/2011 - Miss Universe 2011 in São Paulo, Brazil.
 08/2010 - Miss Vietnam 2010 in Halong Bay, Vietnam.

Humanitarian work and social activities
Vu Hoang My has exhibited passion to improve the education for children in Vietnam. She is affiliated with various charities, including: 
 Tiền Phong Study Encouragement Fund (2010).
 Endorsing and supporting scholarship funds for underprivileged children through Nguyễn Thượng Hiền secondary school in her hometown, Đồng Nai. (2010).
 Fundraiser for Quảng Bình flood victims in 2010.
 Universe Ambassador Operation Smile Vietnam that helps children with cleft lips and palate in Vietnam (2011-now)
 Founder of Run For Knowledge - to build libraries for children  (2012-now)
 Ambassador of 'Case For Girls' Campaign' of OneVietnam Organization - to build a network of Vietnamese living all over the world and exposing them to the problems, and solutions, facing the Vietnamese community at home and abroad.

References

Vietnamese beauty pageant winners
Miss Universe 2011 contestants
Miss World 2012 delegates
1988 births
Living people